Deulin Castle (also Château de Harlez) is a château in the village of Deulin, which forms part of the commune of Hotton, in the province of Luxembourg, Wallonia, Belgium.

It was built from 1758 to 1770 by Guillaume-Joseph de Harlez, and his son Simon-Joseph, and their descendants, the de Harlez de Deulin family, still live there.

See also
List of castles in Belgium
Deulin Village

Notes

Sources
 Château de Deulin website
 Château gardens and arboretum

External links 
Château de Deulin website
Deulin Castle, Tourist office Wallonia and Brussels

Castles in Belgium
Castles in Luxembourg (Belgium)
Hotton